Monkey Bar Games was an American division of the defunct video game developer Vicious Cycle Software, based in Chapel Hill, North Carolina. Monkey Bar's mission was the creation of family entertainment products on all handheld and console video game platforms and the PC.

Games developed

References

External links
 Official site
 Company summary from GameSpot
 Company summary from IGN

Companies based in Chapel Hill-Carrboro, North Carolina
Defunct companies based in North Carolina
Video game companies established in 2005
Video game companies disestablished in 2016
Defunct video game companies of the United States
Video game development companies